The 1996–97 Charleston Southern Buccaneers men's basketball team represented Charleston Southern University in the 1996–97 NCAA Division I men's basketball season. The Buccaneers, led by head coach Tom Conrad, played their home games at the Buccaneer Field House in North Charleston, South Carolina as members of the Big South Conference.

After finishing fourth in the conference regular season standings, the Buccaneers won the Big South tournament to receive an automatic bid to the NCAA tournament. The team lost to No. 2 seed UCLA in the opening round to finish with a 17–13 record (7–7 Big South). To date, this is Charleston Southern's only appearance in the NCAA Tournament in program history.

Roster

Schedule and results

|-
!colspan=12 style=| Regular season

|-
!colspan=12 style=| Big South tournament

|-
!colspan=12 style=| NCAA Tournament

|-

Source

References

Charleston Southern Buccaneers men's basketball seasons
Charleston Southern Buccaneers
Charleston Southern
Charleston Southern Buccaneers men's basketball
Charleston Southern Buccaneers men's basketball